Nagaraja is a title used to refer to the nagas, the serpent-like figures that appear in Indian religions. It refers to the kings of the various races of the nāga, the divine or semi-divine, half-human, half-serpent beings that reside in the netherworld (Patala), and can occasionally take human form. Rituals devoted to these supernatural beings have been taking place throughout South Asia for at least two thousand years.

Hinduism

Hindu texts refer to three main beings by this title: Shesha, Takshaka, and Vasuki. All of them are the children of  the rishi Kashyapa and Kadru.

Shesha
Shesha, also sometimes known as Ananta, is the eldest brother, and the first serpent king of all serpents. A devotee and a mount of Vishnu, he serves as the deity's bed and is named as the noblest of all nagas. He is the being that supports the earth, on the behest of the creator god, Brahma, obtaining the boon to stand ever firmly on the concept of dharma.

Vasuki
Vasuki is the second serpent king in Indian religions. He is a devotee of Shiva, who always wears the nāga around his neck.

Takshaka
Takshaka is the third, and the present serpent king. In the Mahabharata, he ruled the Khandava forest, which was then burnt by the Pandava Arjuna. Later, Takshaka slew Parikshit, the grandson of Arjuna.

These serpents are a group of a thousand brothers, and they also have a sister, whose name is Manasa.

Temples

A temple of the Nagaraja Vasuki is present in Gujarat's district of Thangadh.

At Nagercoil, in Kanyakumari district's of Tamil Nadu, a temple dedicated to Nagaraja exists.

There is another famous temple named Mannarasala in Alleppey district of Kerala. The deity in this temple embodies both Anantha and Vasuki into one.
A temple devoted to nagraja exists in kaippattoor of Ernakulam district in Kerala, India.
It is known as thekkanattil nagaraja kshetram.

A temple devoted to Nagaraja exists in Poojappura of the Thiruvananthapuram District in Kerala, India. It is known as the Poojappura Nagarukavu Temple. The uniqueness of this temple is that here the family of the Nagaraja, including Nagaramma (queen of nagas), and Nagakanya (princess of the naga kingdom) are placed inside a single temple.

Thiruvananthapuram also houses the Thuppanathu Kavu, located at Vazhamuttam. The three serpent deities evoked in this ancient temple are the Nagaraja Vasuki, the naga yakshi (serpent nature spirit), and the naga kanyaka (serpent damsel). Turmeric powder, moorum palum, and nagaroottu are offered to them. Accompanied by the naga deities and Goddesses at Thuppanathu Kavu are the goddess Vanadurga and the goddess Rajarajeswari.

Kukke Subramanya is a Hindu temple located in the village of Subramanya, Karnataka. In this temple Kartikeya is worshipped as Subramanya, the lord of all serpents. The epics relate that the divine serpent Vasuki and other serpents found refuge under Subramanya when threatened by Garuda.

Buddhism 

There are many Nagarajas mentioned throughout various Buddhist texts. There are four major royal races of Nagarajas in Buddhism as the Virupakkhas, the Erapathas, the Chabyaputtas and the Kanhagotamakas. Nāga Kings appears in the audience for many of Gautama Buddha's sermons in Buddhist scriptures. The duties of the Nāga Kings included leading the nagas in protecting the Buddha, other enlightened beings, as well as protecting the Buddha Sasana.

Some of the most notable Nagarajas occurring in Buddhist scriptures are Virupaksa, Mucalinda, Dhrtarastra, Takshaka, Vasuki, Nanda, Upananda, Sagara, Balavan, Anavatapta, Varuna and Utpala.

Virupaksa 

Virūpākṣa (Sanskrit; Pali: Virūpakkha) is a major deity in Buddhism. He is one of the Four Heavenly Kings and a dharmapala. He lives on the western part of Sumeru. He is leader of the nāgas.

Mucalinda 

It is said that four weeks after Gautama Buddha began meditating under the Bodhi Tree, the heavens darkened for seven days, and a prodigious rain descended. However, the mighty King of Serpents, Mucalinda, came from beneath the earth and protected with his hood the one who is the source of all protection. The subject of Buddha meditating under the protection of Mucalinda, also known as naga Prok attitude is very common in Southeast Asian Buddhist art.

Dhrtarastra 

Buddhist literature features a Nāga King named Dhṛtarāṣṭra(Sanskrit; Pali: Dhataraṭṭha). He was the father of Gautama Buddha in a past life when the latter was a bodhisattva named Bhūridatta. He is mentioned in several Buddhist texts such as the Bhūridatta Jātaka, the Mahāmāyūrī Vidyārājñī Sūtra and the Mahāmegha Sūtra.

Apalala 

Apalāla (Pali, Sanskrit) is a water-dwelling Nāga-king in Buddhist mythology. He story of conversion to Buddhism by the Buddha (Pali: Apalāladamana) can be found in Buddhist texts such as Samantapāsādikā and Divyāvadāna; this is one of the most popular legends in Buddhist lore and art.

Duo-luo-shi-qi 
In some Buddhist traditions a figure called Duo-luo-shi-qi or Talasikhin is described as a Dragon King who dwells in a palace within a pond outside the legendary kingdom of Ketumati and drizzles in it during midnight.

See also
 Long Wang (Dragon King)
 Kuzuryū
 Nagraj
 Ur (Mandaeism)
 Taxakeshwar –  Nagaraja temple in Madhya Pradesh 
 Naga Panchami – An auspicious day for naga Worship all over India
 Adishesha
 Vasuki
 Manasa

References

 H.Oldenberg: The Vinaya Pitakam. London 1879, pp. 24–25

External links
 Mannarasala Sri Nagaraja Temple official website

Nāgas

km:នាគក្បាលប្រាំបួន